The Face You Deserve is a 2004 Portuguese film directed by Miguel Gomes.

Cast
José Airosa
Gracinda Nave
Sara Graça
Miguel Barroso
João Nicolau
Ricardo Gross
Rui Catalão
António Figueiredo
Manuel Mozos
Carloto Cotta
Pedro Caldas

Reception
In Público's Ípsilon, Kathleen Gomes and Luís Miguel Oliveira gave the film a rating of "good" and Mário Jorge Torres gave it a rating of "bad".

References

External links

Films directed by Miguel Gomes
Portuguese comedy films